The tenth season of the Case Closed anime was directed by Yasuichiro Yamamoto and produced by TMS Entertainment and Yomiuri Telecasting Corporation. The series is based on Gosho Aoyama's Case Closed manga series. In Japan, the series is titled  but was changed due to legal issues with the title Detective Conan. The episodes' plot follows Conan Edogawa's daily adventures.

The episodes use five pieces of theme music: three opening themes and two closing themes. The first opening theme is "Destiny" by Miki Matsuhashi until episode 258 The second opening theme is "Winter Bells" by Mai Kuraki until episode 270. The third opening theme is "I can't stop my love for you♥" by Rina Aiuchi for the rest of the season.

The season initially ran from October 29, 2001 through July 8, 2002 on Nippon Television Network System in Japan. Episodes 255 to 285 were later collected into nine DVD compilations by Shogakukan. They were released between October 22, 2004 and February 25, 2005 in Japan.


Episode list

References
General

Specific

2001 Japanese television seasons
2002 Japanese television seasons
Season10